Harlan is a given name and a surname.

Harlan may also refer to:

Places

United States
 Harlan, Indiana, an unincorporated census-designated place
 Harlan, Iowa, a city
 Harlan, Kansas, an unincorporated community
 Harlan, Kentucky, a city
 Harlan, Michigan, an unincorporated community
 Harlan, Oregon, an unincorporated community
 Harlan County, Kentucky
 Harlan County, Nebraska
 Harlan Township, Fayette County, Iowa
 Harlan Township, Decatur County, Kansas
 Harlan Township, Warren County, Ohio

Moon
 Harlan (crater)

Other uses
 Harlan (company), full name Harlan Sprague Dawley Inc., suppliers of animals and other services to laboratories
 Harlan Estate, California cult wine producer
 Harlan Community Academy High School, Chicago, Illinois
 Harlan Hall, a historic opera house in Marshall, Illinois
 Harlan – In the Shadow of Jew Süss, a 2008 documentary film about Nazi filmmaker Veit Harlan
 Justice Harlan (disambiguation)